The 2019 Casino Admiral Trophy was a professional tennis tournament played on clay courts. It was the second edition of the tournament which was part of the 2019 ATP Challenger Tour. It took place in Marbella, Spain between 25 and 31 March 2019.

Singles main-draw entrants

Seeds

 1 Rankings are as of 18 March 2019.

Other entrants
The following players received wildcards into the singles main draw:
  Javier Barranco Cosano
  Marko Djokovic
  Carlos Gómez-Herrera
  Jürgen Melzer
  Carlos Taberner

The following player received entry into the singles main draw as an alternate:
  José Hernández-Fernández

The following players received entry into the singles main draw using their ITF World Tennis Ranking:
  Raúl Brancaccio
  Peter Heller
  David Pérez Sanz
  Oriol Roca Batalla

The following players received entry from the qualifying draw:
  Riccardo Bonadio
  Steven Diez

Champions

Singles

 Pablo Andújar def.  Benoît Paire 4–6, 7–6(8–6), 6–4.

Doubles

 Kevin Krawietz /  Andreas Mies def.  Sander Gillé /  Joran Vliegen 7–6(8–6), 2–6, [10–6].

References

2019 ATP Challenger Tour
2019 in Spanish tennis
March 2019 sports events in Spain